Three Maxims is a 1936 British drama film directed by Herbert Wilcox and starring Anna Neagle, Tullio Carminati and Leslie Banks. It was released in the United States under the alternative title  The Show Goes On. Separate French and German language versions were filmed 1935 in Paris. The film's sets were designed by Wilcox's regular art director Lawrence P. Williams.

Premise
A love triangle causes major disruption to the harmony of a trapeze act.

Cast
 Anna Neagle – Pat
 Tullio Carminati – Toni
 Leslie Banks – Mac
 Arthur Finn – Hiram K. Winston
 Olive Blakeney – Mrs Winston
 Miki Hood – Valentine
 Anthony Ireland – Val
 Nicolas Koline – Niki
 Gaston Palmer – Juggler
 Leonard Snelling – Prodigy
 Winifred Oughton – Prodigy's Mother
 Beatrix Fielden-Kaye – Madame Thomas
 Laurence Hanray – Thomas
 Tarva Penna – Doctor
 Vincent Holman – Cafe Proprietor
 Henry Caine – Stage Manager 
 Horace Hodges – Mike

Other film versions
  (1935) with Jean Gabin and Annabella
 Variety (1935) with Hans Albers and Annabella

References

Bibliography
 Low, Rachael. Filmmaking in 1930s Britain. George Allen & Unwin, 1985.
 Wood, Linda. British Films, 1927–1939. British Film Institute, 1986.

External links

1936 films
1936 drama films
British drama films
1930s English-language films
Films directed by Herbert Wilcox
Films with screenplays by Herman J. Mankiewicz
Circus films
British remakes of French films
British remakes of German films
British black-and-white films
Films shot at Imperial Studios, Elstree
1930s British films